Achreshiyeh-ye Bozorg (also Romanized as ‘Achreshīyeh-ye Bozorg; also known as ‘Achreshīyeh, Ajershiyeh, and Ajreshīyeh) is a village in Darkhoveyn Rural District, in the Central District of Shadegan County, Khuzestan Province, Iran. At the 2006 census, its population was 84, in 13 families.

References 

Populated places in Shadegan County